

By law, each new railway is required to mark off the distances along its line from a given point.  The Ffestiniog Railway has changed that point three times in its existence.
Originally the "Zero Point", as it is called was set near to the Dinas station at the north end of the line (at a location called Rhiwbryfdir, now buried under the slate tips).

The second "Zero Point" saw the line turn around and was located at the southern end of the line, on the quayside, at the Welsh Slate Cos. yard, some quarter-mile further on from Porthmadog Harbour railway station.

Following the revival of the line, and at a later date, the "Zero Point" was resited at the water tower at Porthmadog Harbour railway station.

The "accurate" measurement of the line has varied as the line has evolved over the years, not only from the changes above, but with the construction of the Deviation, and other realignments.

See also

 Conwy Valley Line
 British narrow gauge railways
 Slate industry in Wales

References

Bibliography

External links

 
 Ffestiniog
Ffestiniog
Ffestiniog Railway
Railway stations, Ffestiniog

cy:Rheilffordd Ffestiniog
da:Ffestiniog Railway
de:Ffestiniog Railway